"In the Beginning There Was Rhythm / Where There's a Will..." is a split-single by English post-punk artists The Pop Group and The Slits. It was released on 7 March 1980 through Rough Trade Records and Y Records.

Formats and track listing 
UK 7" single (Y1, RT 039A)
The Slits: "In the Beginning There Was Rhythm" – 5:38
The Pop Group: "Where There's a Will There's a Way" – 5:11

Personnel

Side A 

The Slits
 Viv Albertine – guitar
 Ari Up – vocals
 Budgie – drums
 Tessa Pollitt – bass guitar

Technical personnel
 Dennis Bovell – production
 Adam Kidron – engineering
 The Slits – production

Side B 

The Pop Group
 Dan Catsis – bass guitar
 Gareth Sager – guitar, saxophone
 Bruce Smith – drums, percussion
 Mark Stewart – vocals
 John Waddington – guitar

Technical personnel
 Dave Anderson – production
 The Pop Group – production

Charts

References

External links 
 

1980 songs
1980 singles
The Pop Group songs
The Slits songs
Rough Trade Records singles
Split singles
Songs written by Gareth Sager
Songs written by Bruce Smith (musician)
Songs written by Mark Stewart (English musician)